Lynam is a locality in the City of Townsville, Queensland, Australia.

Geography
Most of the locality is undeveloped mountainous land with Mount Cataract as the highest peak (721 metres). The northwestern part of the locality is within the Paluma Range National Park. The central part is within the Clemant State Forest.

The now-closed Greenvale railway line passes through the locality; there were no stations on it within the locality.

History 
The locality was named and bounded on 27 July 1991.

References 

City of Townsville
Localities in Queensland